Alan James "A. J." Healy (born 1969) is an Irish author of children's books. He has written two books, Tommy Storm and its sequel, Tommy Storm and the Galactic Knights. After a rocky childhood, and many jobs around the world, he settled back in Dublin, where he was born, to start writing books. In 2002, he finished Tommy Storm, but was unable to find a publisher due to his being generally unknown. Four years later, he self-published the book, making 5,000 copies. A few months later, when approximately 3,000 books were sold, Quercus bought the rights to publish it. He is now married and has a young child.

Work on Tommy Storm 3 has been indefinitely delayed, as Healy has not received an advance from his publishers, and is instead focused on a project to help combat climate change.

Tommy Storm books

 1. Tommy Storm
 2. Tommy Storm and the Galactic Knights
 3. Tommy Storm 3

References

External links 
The Tommy Storm website
 

Living people
Irish children's writers
Writers from Dublin (city)
1969 births